Yuhang is one of ten urban districts of the prefecture-level city of Hangzhou, the capital of Zhejiang Province, East China. Its 2013 population was estimated at 1.17 million. Its inhabitants speak both Mandarin and a variety of Hangzhounese, a Wu dialect.

On April 9, 2021, Linping District was established, consisting of the former Yuhang subdistricts of Linping, Donghu, Nanyuan, Xingqiao, Yunhe, Qiaosi, Chongxian and the Town of Tangxi.

Yuhang is the largest district of Hangzhou. The administration center of Yuhang District is Linping, which is a subcenter of Hangzhou located in the northeast side of downtown area. It connects with the downtown via Metro Line 1.

History
The district contains the remains of Neolithic settlements from the Liangzhu period.

Prior to the expansion of modern Hangzhou, Yuhang formed a separate city. It is the earliest settlement recorded in the area of present-day Hangzhou. Chinese scholars traditionally interpreted its name as a mistake for "Yu's Ferry", after the legendary account of Yu the Great's gathering of his lords at Mount Kuaiji around  This is now thought to be a folk etymology and Yuhang ( is almost certainly an ancient transliteration of an old Baiyue name.

Yuhang was part of Kuaiji Commandery prior to the growth of Hangzhou following the 7th-century construction of the Sui's Grand Canal. It was then administered from Hangzhou.

Administrative divisions
Subdistricts:
Renhe Subdistrict (仁和街道), Liangzhu Subdistrict (良渚街道), Wuchang Subdistrict (五常街道), Yuhang Subdistrict (余杭街道), Xianlin Subdistrict (闲林街道), Cangqian Subdistrict (仓前街道), Zhongtai Subdistrict (中泰街道)

Towns:
Pingyao (瓶窑镇), Jingshan (径山镇), Luniao (鸬鸟镇), Huanghu (黄湖镇), Baizhang (百丈镇)

Features
The famous tourist attractions here include Liangzhu Culture Museum, Jingshan Tea and Buddhist Monastery, Tangxi Ancient Town, The Grand Canal, Chaoshan Scenic Area, Tianducheng Resorts and Xixi National Wetland Park.

References

External links
Official website of Yuhang District Government

Geography of Hangzhou
Districts of Zhejiang